Annabelle McCauley Allan Short (25 July 193021 July 2020), known professionally as Annie Ross, was a British-American singer and actress, best known as a member of the jazz vocal trio Lambert, Hendricks & Ross.

Early life
Ross was born in Surrey, England, the daughter of Scottish vaudevillians John "Jack" Short and Mary Dalziel Short (née Allan). Her brother was Scottish entertainer and theatre producer and director Jimmy Logan. She first appeared on stage at age three. At the age of four, she travelled to New York by ship with her family; she later recalled that they "got the cheapest ticket, which was right in the bowels of the ship".

Shortly after arriving in the city, she won a token contract with MGM through a children's radio contest run by Paul Whiteman. She subsequently moved with her aunt, Scottish-American singer and actress Ella Logan, to Los Angeles, and her mother, father and brother returned to Scotland. She did not see her parents again until fourteen years later. At the age of seven, she sang "The Bonnie Banks o' Loch Lomond" in Our Gang Follies of 1938, and played Judy Garland's character's sister in Presenting Lily Mars (1943).

At the age of 14, she wrote the song "Let's Fly", which won a songwriting contest and was recorded by Johnny Mercer and The Pied Pipers.

At the end of 10th grade, she left school, changed her name to Annie Ross, and went to Europe, where she established her singing career. She changed her surname to Ross during the plane trip to Prestwick; in a 2011 interview, she said: "My aunt was very fanciful and she said I had an Irish grandmother called Ross, so that's where that surname came from".

Career
In 1952, Ross met Prestige Records owner Bob Weinstock, who asked her to write lyrics to a jazz solo in a similar way to King Pleasure, a practice that would later be known as vocalese. The next day, she presented him with "Twisted", a treatment of saxophonist Wardell Gray's 1949 composition of the same name, a classic example of the genre. The song, first released in 1952 (later collected on the album King Pleasure Sings/Annie Ross Sings), was an underground hit, and resulted in her winning Down Beat magazine's New Star award.

In February 1956, the British music magazine NME reported that Ross's version of the song "I Want You to Be My Baby" was banned by the BBC due to the lyric "Come upstairs and have some loving".

She recorded seven albums with Lambert, Hendricks & Ross between 1957 and 1962. Their first, Sing a Song of Basie (1957), was to have been performed by a group of singers hired by Jon Hendricks and Dave Lambert with Ross brought in only as vocal consultant. It was decided that the trio should attempt to record the material and overdub all the additional vocals themselves, but the first two tracks were recorded and deemed unsatisfactory so they ditched the dubbing idea. The resulting album was a success, and the trio became an international hit. Over the next five years, Lambert, Hendricks & Ross toured all over the world and recorded such albums as The Hottest New Group in Jazz (1959), Sing Ellington (1960), High Flying (1962), and The Real Ambassadors (1962), written by Dave Brubeck and featuring Louis Armstrong and Carmen McRae.

Ross left the group in 1962 and in 1964 opened a nightclub in London. Annie's Room hosted Joe Williams, Nina Simone, Stuff Smith, Blossom Dearie, Anita O'Day, Jon Hendricks, and Erroll Garner.

Her adulthood film roles included Liza in the film Straight On till Morning (1972), Claire in Alfie Darling (1976), Diana Sharman in Funny Money (1983), Vera Webster in Superman III (1983), Mrs. Hazeltine in Throw Momma from the Train (1987), Rose Brooks in Witchery (1988), Loretta Cresswood in Pump Up the Volume (1990), Tess Trainer in Robert Altman's Short Cuts (1993), and Lydia in Blue Sky (1994). She also appeared as Granny Ruth in the horror films Basket Case 2 (1990) and Basket Case 3: The Progeny (1991). She also had a bit part in Robert Altman's The Player in 1992. Ross also starred in Scottish Television's comedy-drama Charles Endell Esquire (1979).

She provided the speaking voice for Britt Ekland in The Wicker Man (1973), and Ingrid Thulin's singing voice in Salon Kitty (1976). On stage, she appeared in Cranks (1955; London and New York City), The Threepenny Opera (1972), The Seven Deadly Sins (1973) at the Royal Opera House, Kennedy's Children (1975) at Arts Theatre, London, Side by Side by Sondheim, and in the Joe Papp production of The Pirates of Penzance (1982).

Personal life
In 1949, Ross had a brief affair with drummer Kenny Clarke. This affair produced a son, Kenny Clarke Jr. (born 1950), who was raised by Clarke's brother and his wife. During her time with Lambert, Hendricks & Ross, she became addicted to heroin and in the late 1950s had an affair with the comedian Lenny Bruce, who was also having drug problems. By 1960, Carol Sloane was substituting for her on tour. After a performance by the trio in London in May 1962, she remained in London to confront her drug addiction.

In 1963, she married actor Sean Lynch; they divorced in 1975, and he died in a car crash soon afterwards. By that time, she had also lost her home and declared bankruptcy.

She became a United States citizen in 2001. Ross died in New York City on 21 July 2020 from emphysema and heart disease, four days before her 90th birthday.

Awards and honours
Ross received the ASCAP Jazz Wall of Fame award (2009), the National Endowment for the Arts Jazz Masters' Award (2010), and the MAC Award for Lifetime Achievement (2011).

In July 2006 a one-woman play entitled TWISTED: The Annie Ross Story by Brian McGeachan premiered at The Space Theatre in London, starring Verity Quade. It focused on her stormy relationship with her aunt, Broadway legend Ella Logan, her brief affair with the comedian Lenny Bruce and her addiction to heroin. The play transferred to the Brockley Jack Theatre in London that same year, with Ross being played by Betsy Pennington.

A documentary about Ross's life, entitled No One But Me, premiered at the Glasgow Film Festival in 2012.

Discography
 New Sounds from France with Jack Dieval, James Moody (Prestige, 1950)
 Annie by Candlelight with Tony Crombie (Pye, Nixa, 1956)
 Cranks with John Cranko, John Addison (His Master's Voice, 1956)
 Gypsy with Buddy Bregman (World Pacific, 1959)
 A Gasser! with Zoot Sims (World Pacific, 1959)
 Annie Ross Sings a Song with Mulligan! with Gerry Mulligan (World Pacific, 1959) 
 Sings a Handful of Songs (Ember, 1963) 
 Loguerhythms: Songs from the Establishment with Tony Kinsey (Transatlantic, 1963)
 Portrait of Annie Ross (Pye, 1965)
 Recorded at the Tenth German Jazz Festival in Frankfurt with Pony Poindexter (SABA, 1966)
 Fill My Heart with Song (Decca, 1968)
 Singin' 'n' Swingin with Dorothy Dunn, Shelby Davis (Savoy, 1969)
 You and Me Baby (Decca, 1971)
 In Hoagland with Hoagy Carmichael, Georgie Fame (Bald Eagle, 1981)
 Like Someone in Love (Bulldog, 1983)
 Music Is Forever (DRG, 1996)
 Live in London (Harkit, 2003)
 To Lady with Love (Red Anchor, 2014)

With Dave Lambert and Jon Hendricks
 Sing a Song of Basie (ABC-Paramount, 1958) 
 The Swingers! with Zoot Sims (World Pacific, 1959)
 Sing Along with Basie with Count Basie, Joe Williams (Roulette, 1959)
 The Hottest New Group in Jazz (Columbia, 1959) 
 Sing Ellington with Ike Isaacs (Columbia, 1960)
 High Flying with Ike Isaacs (Columbia, 1961)
 The Real Ambassadors with Louis Armstrong, Dave Brubeck, Carmen McRae (Columbia Masterworks, 1962)
 Everybody's Boppin (Columbia, 1989) compilation

Filmography

References

External links
 
 
 
"I Was Billie Holiday's Replacement", BBC Radio 4 documentary about Ross broadcast on 25 May 2017
 
Collection: Annie Ross papers: archives and special collections at Rutgers

 

1930 births
2020 deaths
20th-century American actresses
20th-century American women singers
20th-century English actresses
20th-century English women singers
20th-century English singers
21st-century American women singers
21st-century English women singers
21st-century English singers
American women jazz singers
American film actresses
American jazz singers
American voice actresses
British emigrants to the United States
British women jazz singers
Deaths from emphysema
English film actresses
English jazz singers
English people of Scottish descent
English voice actresses
Lambert, Hendricks & Ross members
Nightclub owners
RCA Victor artists
Transatlantic Records artists
Vocalese singers
Volpi Cup winners
20th-century American singers
21st-century American singers